Hochbaum is a surname.

Notable people with the surname are:

 Dorit S. Hochbaum, American mathematician and professor
 Friedrich Hochbaum (1894–1955), German general
 Tama Hochbaum (born 1953), American artist and photographer
 Werner Hochbaum (1899–1946), German filmmaker
 Hans Albert Hochbaum (1911–1988), 1945 winner of the Brewster Medal
 Robert Hochbaum, German member of the 17th Bundestag
 Godfrey M. Hochbaum, a developer of the health belief model
 Paul Hochbaum, president of the European Law Students' Association, 1985-1990